Jovica is a masculine given name. It is a hypocoristic form of the name Jovan.

Notable people with the given name include:

Jovica Antonić (born 1966), Serbian professional basketball coach, former player
Jovica Arsić (born 1968), Serbian basketball coach
Jovica Blagojević (born 1998), Serbian footballer
Jovica Cvetković (born 1959), Serbian handball coach and former Olympic player
Jovica Damjanović (born 1975), retired Serbian football midfielder
Jovica Elezović (born 1956), former Yugoslav handball player
Jovica Jevtić (born 1975), politician in Serbia
Jovica Kolb (born 1963), Serbian former football player
Jovica Lakić (born 1974), retired Serbian professional footballer
Jovica Milijić (born 1986), Serbian-born Maltese futsal player
Jovica Nikolić (born 1959), Serbian former midfielder
Jovica Raduka or Joe Raduka (born 1954), former Serbian-American soccer player
Jovica Rujević (born 1977), Serbian male badminton player
Jovica Simanic or Jovo Simanić (born 1965), Serbian retired footballer
Jovica Škoro (born 1947), Serbian football manager and former player
Jovica Stanišić (born 1950), former head of the Serbian State Security Service
Jovica Stokić (born 1987), Bosnian professional footballer
Jovica Tasevski-Eternijan (born 1976), Macedonian poet, essayist and literary critic
Jovica Trajcev (born 1981), Macedonian football player
Jovica Vasilić (born 1990), Serbian footballer
Jovica Veljović (born 1954), Serbian type designer and calligrapher
Jovica Vico (born 1978), former Bosnian professional footballer

Notable people with the eponymous surname include:

Victor Jovica (born 1945), Croatian-born Puerto Rican professional wrestler and promoter

See also
Jović
Jovičić
Ivica

Serbian masculine given names
Croatian surnames